The Ohio Department of Public Safety (ODPS) is the administrative department of the Ohio state government responsible for the protection and safety of residents and visitors. The Department of Public Safety's headquarters is located in Columbus, Ohio.

History 
On May 19, 1953, Amended House Bill 243 created the Ohio Department of Highway Safety, consisting of the Ohio Bureau of Motor Vehicles and Ohio State Highway Patrol, effective October 2, 1953. On September 24, 1992, the department was renamed the Ohio Department of Public Safety.

Divisions 
 Ohio Bureau of Motor Vehicles
 Ohio Emergency Management Agency
 Emergency Medical Services
 Office of Criminal Justice Services
 Ohio Office of Homeland Security
 Ohio State Highway Patrol
 Ohio Investigative Unit

See also 

 List of law enforcement agencies in Ohio

References

External links 
Ohio Department of Public Safety

Public Safety
Public Safety